Losing is the second studio album by American rock band Bully. It was released on October 20, 2017 by Sub Pop. The album was produced by Bully frontwoman Alicia Bognanno and recorded in 2016 at Electrical Audio in Chicago.

Track listing

Personnel
Credits are adapted from the album's liner notes.

Bully
 Alicia Bognanno – vocals, guitar
 Reece Lazarus – bass
 Clayton Parker – guitar

Additional musicians
 Casey Weissbuch – drums

Production
 Chris Allgood – mastering (assistant)
 Alicia Bognanno – engineering, mixing
 Emily Lazar – mastering
 Jon San Paolo – engineering (assistant)

Design
 Stewart Copeland – artwork
 Alysse Gafkjen – photography

Charts

References

External links
 

2017 albums
Bully (band) albums
Sub Pop albums